"Cercopes" was a slapstick, epic poem attributed to Homer, written circa the 7th or 8th century BC. The contents of this poem have been lost. The surviving fragments of this work are published under Hesiod's works in the Loeb Classical Library.

References

Bibliography
 Tripp, Edward (1974) The Meridian Handbook of Classical Mythology New York, Penguin Group

External links 
 Kerkopes

Homer
Lost poems
Ancient Greek mock-heroic poems